This is a list of the National Register of Historic Places listings in Acadia National Park.

This is intended to be a complete list of the properties and districts on the National Register of Historic Places in Acadia National Park, Maine, United States.  The locations of National Register properties and districts for which the latitude and longitude coordinates are included below, may be seen in a Google map.

There are eleven properties and districts listed on the National Register in the park.

Current listings 

|}

See also 
 National Register of Historic Places listings in Hancock County, Maine
 National Register of Historic Places listings in Maine

References